is a trans-Neptunian object from the scattered disc in the outermost region of the Solar System and measures approximately 460 kilometers in diameter. It was first observed by American astronomers David Rabinowitz, Megan Schwamb, and Suzanne Tourtellotte at ESO's La Silla Observatory in northern Chile on 2 October 2010.

Orbit and classification 

 is a probably a dwarf planet, based on Michael Brown's classification. Typical for scattered disc objects, it has an elliptical and inclined orbit: the object orbits the Sun at a distance of 39.9–84.9 AU once every 492 years and 9 months (179,965 days; semi-major axis of 62.4 AU). Its orbit has an eccentricity of 0.36 and an inclination of 39° with respect to the ecliptic. The body's observation arc begins with its first observation at La Silla in October 2010.

Physical characteristics 

's color and taxonomic type have not yet been determined.

Rotation period 

As of 2018, no rotational lightcurve of  has been obtained from photometric observations. The object's rotation period, shape and poles remain unknown.

Diameter and albedo 

According to the Johnston's Archive and Michael Brown,  measures 443 and 471 kilometers in diameter, and its surface has an assumed albedo of 0.09 and 0.07, respectively.

Numbering and naming 

This minor planet has neither been numbered nor named.

References

External links 
 Asteroid Lightcurve Database (LCDB), query form (info )
 
 

Minor planet object articles (unnumbered)

20101002